Nibionno (locally ) is a comune (municipality) in the Province of Lecco in the Italian region Lombardy, located about  north of Milan and about  southwest of Lecco.

Nibionno borders the following municipalities: Bulciago, Cassago Brianza, Costa Masnaga, Inverigo, Lambrugo, Veduggio con Colzano.

The town's economy is mostly based on textile industry.

References

Cities and towns in Lombardy
Populated places on Brianza